Former Catholics or ex-Catholics are people who used to be Catholic for some time, but no longer identify as such. This includes both individuals who were at least nominally raised in the Roman Catholic faith, and individuals who converted to it in later life, both of whom later rejected and left it, or converted to other faiths (including the related non-Roman Catholic faiths). This page lists well-known individuals in history who are former Catholics.

One 2008 Pew Research Center study estimates that 10.1% of people in the United States describe themselves as former Catholics in some sense. In total the study reports that 44% of Americans profess a different religious affiliation than the one they were raised in. A majority converted to another religion while a substantial minority are counted as currently unaffiliated.

Note: The list includes those who leave the Catholic Church including any Eastern Catholic Church which is in communion with it. People such as Eddie Doherty, who were allowed to transfer from the Latin Catholic Church to an Eastern Catholic church, or vice versa are not considered as "former Roman Catholics", while Eastern Catholics who convert to a non-Catholic church or another religion are considered as such, even though Eastern Catholics do not typically refer to themselves as "Roman".

Individuals who converted to other churches, denominations and faiths

Eastern Orthodoxy

 Rod Dreher, writer who converted to Catholicism and then to Eastern Orthodoxy
 H. Tristram Engelhardt Jr., philosopher and bioethicist
 Tom Hanks, actor, was involved with Catholicism, Mormonism and the Nazarens as a child, and was a "Bible-toting evangelical teenager", and converted to the Greek Orthodox Church after marrying his second wife.
 Karl Matzek, artist who joined the Eastern Orthodox Church
 John Anthony McGuckin, scholar, poet, and priest of the Romanian Orthodox Church
 Alexis Toth, Ruthenian Catholic Church priest who converted to Orthodoxy and became a saint in the Orthodox Church in America
 Nathaniel (Popp), archbishop of the Orthodox Church in America's Romanian Episcopate and former interim Metropolitan of the Orthodox Church in America who converted from the Romanian Greek-Catholic Church on 15 February 1968
 Helen of Anjou, queen consort of the Serbian Kingdom
 Ita Rina, Yugoslav film actress and beauty queen

Anglicanism and churches in communion

 King Henry VIII, king of England who separated the Church of England from the Roman Catholic Church.
 Gregorio Aglipay, Filipino priest who joined the Philippine Independent Church.
 Madeleine Albright, former US Secretary of State.
 Pete Buttigieg, former mayor of South Bend, Indiana, a presidential candidate in the 2020 election, and current United States Secretary of Transportation.
 The Very Revd Miriam Byrne, Irish Catholic nun who became a cathedral provost in the Scottish Episcopal Church.
 James Francis Byrnes, politician and statesman, United States Senator, US Secretary of State, and former Associate Justice of the US Supreme Court, raised a Catholic in largely Protestant South Carolina, converted to Episcopalianism as an adult.   
 Thomas Cranmer, Archbishop of Canterbury and Reformer who helped reform the Church of England during the English Reformation.
 Alberto Cutié, priest who was received in the Episcopal Church after a leave of absence granted by his former bishop and decided to continue priestly ministry as a married man.
 Matthew Fox, scholar and priest who became an Episcopalian after being silenced by the Vatican for heresy and expelled by the Dominicans for disobedience.
 Bernard Kenny, New Jersey politician, former majority leader of the New Jersey Senate raised Catholic, became an Episcopalian in protest over Catholic position on abortion.  
 Jim McGreevey, former Governor of New Jersey, who became an Episcopalian.
 Thomas Nast, political cartoonist, baptized a Catholic in Germany, emigrated to the United States and became an Episcopalian as an adult.  
 Autumn Phillips, received into the Church of England before marrying Peter Phillips to retain his place in the line of succession
 Kevin Rudd, former prime minister of Australia.
 The Most Revd Katharine Jefferts Schori, first woman primate in the Anglican Communion
 Josette Sheeran, director of the United Nations World Food Programme and former editor with the Washington Times, left the Catholic Church to join the Unification Church and later joined the Episcopal Church.
 Joris Vercammen, Archbishop of Utrecht, spiritual leader of the Utrecht Union of Old Catholic Churches
John B. Switzer, theologian at Spring Hill College (the Jesuit College of the South); Switzer was a seminarian for the Catholic Diocese of Biloxi studying at the Pontifical North American College in Rome and left seminary training six months before ordination to marry. He is now a priest of the Episcopal Diocese of Mississippi and continues to teach at Spring Hill.

Independent Catholic churches
 Manuel Alonso Corral, Palmarian Catholic Church (anti)pope
 Clemente Domínguez y Gómez, Palmarian Catholic Church (anti)pope

Christian Science
 Joan Crawford, American actress
 Doris Day, American actress
 Philip Kerr, 11th Marquess of Lothian, British Ambassador

Mormonism

 Isabelle Collin Dufresne, later known as Ultra Violet, one of the Warhol superstars
 Glenn Beck
 Mia Love

Protestantism

Calvinism

 John Calvin, French religious reformer
 John Barrasso, United States Senator from Wyoming, raised Catholic, converted to Presbyterianism
 Charles Chiniquy, American anti-Catholic writer
 Clive Derby-Lewis, South African Far-Right politician and convicted murderer 
 Diana DeGette, U.S. Representative for Colorado's 1st congressional district, converted to Presbyterianism
 Mark Driscoll, founding pastor of Mars Hill Church in Seattle
 Melissa Joan Hart, actress, converted to Presbyterianism.
 Dorothy Lucey, news reporter on Good Day LA, converted to the Presbyterian Church (USA) 
 Tom Tancredo, former U.S. Representative for Colorado's 6th congressional district, U.S. Presidential candidate in 2008, Constitution Party candidate for Governor of Colorado in 2010, now Evangelical Presbyterian

Lutheranism
 Marie Cavallier (now Princess Marie of Denmark), converted upon marriage to Prince Joachim of Denmark
 Friedrich Heiler, religious scholar in High Church Lutheranism. (Dispute about whether he truly left Catholicism)
 Henrik, Prince Consort of Denmark, converted upon marriage to Heiress Presumptive Margrethe (now Queen Margrethe II of Denmark)
 Karel Lavrič, Slovenian liberal nationalist politician and orator
 Katharina Luther, former nun who married Martin Luther
 Martin Luther, Protestant reformer and theologian, excommunicated by papal bull Decet Romanum Pontificem
 Philip Melanchthon, Lutheran theologian and Protestant reformer
 Thorsten Schäfer-Gümbel, German politician of the SPD
 Primož Trubar, Slovenian Protestant preacher and writer
 Tim Walz, Governor of Minnesota and former U.S. Representative from Minnesota's 1st congressional district.

Pentecostalism
 Marcelo Crivella, mayor of Rio de Janeiro, Brazil
 J. Regina Hyland, pioneer in the field of animals and religion
 Edir Macedo, founded the Universal Church of the Kingdom of God
 Efraín Ríos Montt, former de facto President of Guatemala
 Mariano Rivera, Panamanian-American Hall of Fame baseball pitcher for the New York Yankees
 Marina Silva, Brazilian politician and environmentalist.

Seventh-day Adventism

 Mark Finley, pastor and speaker emeritus of It Is Written (Adventist TV program)
 Marianne Thieme, Dutch politician, Party for the Animals co-founder, converted to Adventism in 2006
 Walter Veith, scientist, author and speaker known for his work in nutrition, creationism and other Christian topics

Other Protestant
 Stephen Baldwin, actor converted to non-denominational Protestantism.  
 James Comey, attorney and former Director of the Federal Bureau of Investigation, converted to the United Methodist Church
 Matthew Dowd, political consultant, chief strategist for the 2004 Bush-Cheney presidential campaign, raised a Catholic, converted to non-denominational Protestantism.  
 Bob Enyart, Christian talk-show host, pastor of a non-denominational Protestant church.
 Scott Greer, Daily Caller alumnus, podcaster and author, converted to Protestantism
 Johannes Gossner, priest, became Protestant, probably Lutheran
 Marjorie Taylor Greene, politician, converted to non-denominational evangelical Protestantism.
 Sean Hannity, Irish American radio host, political commentator and media personality, raised Catholic, left the Catholic Church in 2019 and became an evangelical Protestant.  
 Vanessa Hudgens, actress and singer, converted to non-denominational Protestantism.
 Jan Hus, theologian who founded the Hussites, influenced the Protestant Reformation
 Jerome of Prague, friend of Jan Hus and Short-Lived leader of the Hussites
 John Kasich, Governor of Ohio, converted after parents' death to non-denominational Protestantism.  
 Mathieu Kérékou, former President of Benin serving for 45 years from 1971 to 2006
 Mallory McMorrow, Michigan State Senator, now identifies only as Christian.
 Manny Pacquiao, Filipino boxer and politician, Raised Catholic, converted to Evangelical Protestantism later in life.  
 Sarah Palin, former Governor of Alaska, converted with family as a child to non-denominational Protestantism.
 Domineco da Pascia and Silvestro Maruffi, former Italian monks and friends of Girolamo Savonarola
 Tim Pawlenty, Governor of Minnesota 2003–2011, converted and attending Protestant church with spouse Mary Pawlenty
 Mike Pence, Vice President of the United States, raised Catholic, converted to Evangelical Protestantism while in college.
 Gina Rodriguez, actress, now attends a non-denominational Protestant church.
 Maria Elvira Salazar, Cuban-American journalist and politician, raised Catholic, converted to Evangelical Protestantism as a young adult.

Gottgläubigkeit
The gottgläubig movement was an officially sanctioned unorganised religion in Nazi Germany. Several prominent Nazi leaders started leaving their Catholic or Protestant churches over the course of 1936 as an act of political protest after a gradual worsening of relations with the churches, whom they accused of meddling in Germany's internal affairs. The Gottgläubigen stressed they still believed in a creator-God who guided the German nation, and rejected atheism and irreligion. The movement disappeared shortly after World War II.
 Heinrich Himmler, SS leader
 Reinhard Heydrich, SS leader
 Carl Röver, Gauleiter of Weser-Ems

Other former Catholics

 Anne Rice, American writer, converted from Roman Catholicism and made this official through several messages on her website on 29 July 2010. She no longer wishes to be referred to as a ‘Christian’, though retains her belief in Christ, disagreeing with various positions of the Roman Catholic Church.
 Magdi Allam, Egyptian–Italian journalist who publicly converted from Sunni Islam to Catholicism in 2008, baptised by Pope Benedict XVI himself. He left the Catholic Church dissatisfied after the election of Pope Francis in 2013, primarily because he thought the Church failed to take a tough stance against Islam; he remained a Christian, however.

Buddhism
 Roberto Baggio, Italian footballer
 Lokanatha (Salvatore Cioffi), Italian Theravadin Buddhist missionary monk
 Pema Chödrön (Deirdre Blomfield-Brown), Tibetan Buddhist nun, mother and grandmother
 Tsai Chih Chung, Taiwanese cartoonist
 Patrick Duffy, actor
 Fabian Fucan, Japanese writer and religious brother in Society of Jesus, eventually converted to Zen Buddhism.
 Sabina Guzzanti, Italian satirist, actress, writer and producer
 John Daido Loori, Zen Buddhist rōshi and the abbot of Zen Mountain Monastery
 Nyanatiloka Mahathera (Anton Walther Florus Gueth), founder of Island Hermitage and one of the earliest western Buddhist monk in modern time.
 Leung Man-tao, Hong Kong writer, critic and host
 Michael O'Keefe, Irish-American actor, raised Catholic, became a practicing Zen Buddhist in 1981.  
 Christine Rankin, New Zealand politician and former head of Ministry of Social Development.
 Hwang Woo-Suk, South Korean scientist

Islam

 Kareem Abdul-Jabbar, American Hall of Fame basketball player, author, born Ferdinand Lewis Alcindor, Jr., raised Catholic in New York City where he attended Catholic schools, converted to Islam in 1971 at age 24.  
 Keith Ellison, first Muslim to serve in the United States Congress
 Everlast, Irish-American rapper and guitar player
 René Guénon, French philosopher
 Diana Haddad, singer raised in the Maronite Church
 Murad Wilfred Hofmann, diplomat
 John Walker Lindh, American captured as an enemy combatant during the United States' invasion of Afghanistan in November 2001; baptized Catholic, he converted to Sunni Islam at age 16.  
 Ingrid Mattson, president of the Islamic Society of North America. (She abandoned Catholicism years before her conversion to Islam)
 Matthew Saad Muhammad, boxer
 Peter Murphy, lead singer of Bauhaus
 Sinéad O'Connor, ordained as a priest in the Irish Orthodox Catholic and Apostolic Church by Michael Cox in 1999; accepted Islam in 2018, becoming Shuhada' Davitt
 Vinnie Paz, also known as Ikon the Verbal Hologram; American rapper for the underground hip hop group Jedi Mind Tricks
 Franck Ribéry, French footballer, converted in 2006 to marry his Muslim girlfriend
 Abel Xavier, Portuguese footballer, grew up in a strict Catholic background in Portuguese Mozambique

Judaism

 Abraham ben Abraham, Polish Talmudic scholar (conflicting stories though)
 B'nai Moshe, Peruvian community of Inca descent which embraced Judaism
 Bishop Bodo, deacon
 Campbell Brown, American television news reporter, currently an anchor and political pundit for CNN and a former co-anchor of NBC's Weekend Today
 Yisrael Campbell, comedian
 Stephen Dubner, American author
 Abe Foxman, lawyer, activist and former head of the Anti-Defamation League.  Born into a Jewish family, he was left with a Polish woman during World War II, who baptized him and raised him Catholic; he was returned to his parents in 1944, whereupon he reverted to Judaism.  
 Paula Fredriksen, American scholar and historian of religion
 Aaron Freeman, American journalist and comedian
 Thomas Jones, English publisher
 John King, American journalist and the host of CNN's State of the Union
 Anne Meara (1929–2015), American comedian and actress, partner and wife of Jerry Stiller
 Mary Doria Russell, American author
 Jews of San Nicandro, Roman Catholic proselyte community to Judaism in Italy
 Joseph Abraham Steblicki, teacher and treasurer
 Karen Tintori, American author of fiction and nonfiction
 Géza Vermes, biblical scholar, Hebraist and historian of religion, best known for being an eminent historical Jesus scholar and translator of the Dead Sea Scrolls; a former Catholic priest of Jewish descent, he rediscovered his Jewish roots, abandoned Christianity and converted to Liberal Judaism.
 John David Scalamonti, former Catholic priest, converted to Orthodox Judaism.
 Kenneth Cox, former Catholic priest; changed his name to Abraham Carmel and converted to Orthodox Judaism.

Kabbalah
 Ariana Grande, American actress and singer
 Madonna, American singer-songwriter, actress, and businesswoman

Raëlism
 Brigitte Boisselier, mostly known for her association with Clonaid and the Raëlian Church, raised as a Catholic in Champagne-Ardenne, holds a doctorate in physical chemistry from the University of Dijon in France and another one in analytical chemistry from the University of Houston

Scientology

 Tom Cruise, American actor, originally desired to become a priest. His girlfriend Katie Holmes married him and also switched from Catholicism to Scientology, but upon her divorce from Cruise in 2012, she returned to the Roman Catholic Church.
 Jenna Elfman, American actress
 David Miscavige, leading figure in Scientology
 John Travolta, American actor, in 1975
 Nancy Cartwright, American actress
 Catherine Bell, American actress

Debatable
This section lists some who, while adopting ideas that some others would consider incompatible with the Catholic faith, may have defected from the Church neither by a formal act nor even informally by an act of heresy, schism or apostasy. Mere attendance at services of another religion or adoption of certain meditation techniques need not signify abandonment of one's own religion. According to a 2009 survey of the Pew Research Center Forum on Religion and Public Life, one in five American Catholics report that they at times attend places of worship other than the local Catholic parish (which does not have to mean non-Catholic places). The same survey noted that some Catholics incorporate "yoga as a spiritual practice", emphasize psychics, and draw on and involve themselves in other religious movements.

 Fidel Castro, excommunicated
 Jack Clayton, British director who identified himself as an "ex-Catholic"
 Irene Dailey, American actress who became a Unitarian
 Christopher Durang, American playwright
 Edward Gibbon, converted to Catholicism at Oxford University, a year later, under threat of being disinherited, returned to Anglicanism
 Heather Graham, American actress (Transcendental Meditation)
 Michael Harrington, American political activist, grew up Catholic, lapsed whilst adopting more radical politics.
 Ammon Hennacy, American pacifist, Christian anarchist, vegetarian and social activist
 Anne Jackson, American actress of Irish and Croatian extraction; married to Eli Wallach
 Bill Keller, New York Times editor who said he was a "collapsed Catholic"
 Richard Lugner, excommunicated, he is a successful Austrian entrepreneur in the construction industry, and a Viennese society figure
 Emmanuel Milingo, excommunicated, former Zambian Roman Catholic archbishop
 Conor Oberst, singer-songwriter

Atheism, agnosticism, or non-religious

This section contains people who rejected Catholicism in favor of a non-religious philosophy, including atheism, agnosticism and secular humanism.

 Alex Agnew, Belgian comedian and musician
 Steve Allen, American actor, TV show host, comedian, writer, musician (secular humanist and scientific skeptic)
 Javier Bardem, Spanish actor
 Floris van den Berg, Dutch philosopher and writer
 Paul Bettany, British actor
 Mike Birbiglia, American comedian, writer, actor, and director
 Christopher Buckley, political satirist
 Ed Byrne, Irish stand-up comedian
 George Carlin, American stand-up comedian
 Antonio Carluccio, Italian chef, restaurateur and food expert
 Jimmy Carr, British comedian
 Jim Carroll, American poet, diarist and musician
 George Clooney, American actor (agnostic)
 Pat Condell, British comedian
 Billy Connolly, Scottish stand-up comedian
 Marie Curie, Nobel laureate in chemistry and physics
 Guillermo del Toro, Mexican film director
 Amanda Donohoe, British actress
 Klaas Dijkhoff, Dutch politician
 Theodore Dreiser, American writer (Socialism and possibly Christian Science)
 Roger Ebert, American journalist, film critic and screenwriter
 Brian Eno, British musician and record producer
 Siobhan Fahey, British musician, member of Bananarama, now interested in spiritualism
 Nick Frost, British actor, comedian and screenwriter
 Janeane Garofalo, American comedian (Freethought advocate).
 William Jay Gaynor, politician and judge who became the 94th mayor of New York City. raised Catholic and briefly attended Christian Brothers seminary. Lost belief in organized religion and became an agnostic. 
 Éamon Gilmore, Tánaiste (Deputy Prime Minister) of Ireland (2011–2017)
 Kathy Griffin, American comedian and actress
 James Gunn, American film director and screenwriter for Guardians of the Galaxy who abandoned his Catholicism at the age of 11.
 Greg Gutfeld, American television personality
 Amber Heard, American actress
 Joe Higgins, Socialist Party Member of the European Parliament for Dublin, Ireland
 François Hollande, 24th President of France
 Anton van Hooff, Dutch classical historian and columnist
 Anthony Jeselnik, American stand-up comedian and television writer
 , Belgian musical band consisting of "Jos Smos", "Zjuul Krapuul" and "Stef Bef" (pseudonyms) who had been singing songs critical of religion for over 30 years before deciding to "debaptise" themselves from the Catholic Church in 2010, and writing an "Ontdopingslieke" ("Debaptism Song") to urge others to do the same. They did this after a series Catholic Church sexual abuse cases of children around the world came to light.
 Denis Leary, American actor
 John Lydon, British musician, singer for The Sex Pistols and Public Image Ltd.
 Seth MacFarlane, writer, creator, producer for Family Guy, American Dad, etc.
 James McAvoy, Scottish actor
 Barry McGowan, American author and Atheist leader
 Pauline McLynn, Irish character actress and author
 Bill Maher, American comedian and television personality
 Zoran Milanović, Croatian politician and a leader of Social Democratic Party of Croatia (SDP)
 Roh Moo-hyun, 16th President of South Korea
 Giorgio Napolitano, 11th President of Italy
 Dara Ó Briain, Irish stand-up comedian and television presenter
 Joyce Carol Oates, author, critic (atheist)
 Conor Oberst, American singer-songwriter
 Bob Odenkirk, American actor and comedian; stated on his Twitter
 Ronald Plasterk, Dutch professor of microbiology and Minister of Education and Domestic Affairs
 Park Chan-wook, South Korean film director
 Joe Rogan, American sports commentator and stand-up comedian (agnostic)
 Chris Rush, American comedian who considers himself spiritual rather than religious
 Dan Savage, author
 Andy Serkis, British actor
 Omar Sharif, actor and bridge player; an Egyptian Melkite Catholic who converted to Islam, later became an atheist
 Aziz Shavershian, Australian bodybuilder and internet celebrity. 
 Julia Sweeney, atheist comedian on the advisory board of the Secular Coalition for America
 Janez Stanovnik, Slovenian resistance fighter and politician
 Laurie Taylor (sociologist)
 Josip Broz Tito, Yugoslav political leader
 Rob Trip, Dutch television and radio presenter, calls himself a "cultural Catholic, (...) but I'm not religious at all. Not Catholic and not believing."
 Jerome Tuccille, author of Heretic: Confessions of an Ex-Catholic Rebel
 , Dutch television presenter and producer
 Dana White, first and current president of UFC
 Robert Anton Wilson, American author, philosopher, novelist, essayist and polymath (agnostic)
 Terry Wogan, Irish and British radio personality
 Željko Komšić, Croat member of the Bosnian presidency

See also
 List of former Catholic priests
 List of former atheists and agnostics
 List of former Christians
 List of former Protestants
 List of former or dissident Mormons
 List of former Muslims
 List of people excommunicated by the Roman Catholic Church
 List of people who converted to Catholicism

Footnotes

 
Roman Catholics
Former Roman Catholics